is a railway station in the town of Oguni, Yamagata Prefecture, Japan, operated by East Japan Railway Company (JR East).

Lines
Uzen-Matsuoka Station is served by the Yonesaka Line, and is located 54.7 rail kilometers from the terminus of the line at Yonezawa Station.

Station layout
The station has one side platform serving a single bi-directional track. The station is unattended.

History
Uzen-Matsuoka Station opened on October 30, 1935. The station was absorbed into the JR East network upon the privatization of JNR on 1 April 1987.

Surrounding area

See also
List of Railway Stations in Japan

External links

  JR East Station information 

Railway stations in Yamagata Prefecture
Yonesaka Line
Railway stations in Japan opened in 1935
Stations of East Japan Railway Company
Oguni, Yamagata